

The Avro 536 and its follow-on design, the 546 were developments of the 504 military biplane, marketed for civil use in the years following World War I. Principally intended for joyriding, the aircraft had greater wing area and a more powerful engine to lift four passengers, seated in two rows of side-by-side seats behind the pilot.

In service at Blackpool, Avro 536s flown by three pilots were able to fly about 500 passengers on their first day of operation. At least one 536 was still providing joyrides on Jersey as late as 1927.

A single variant was produced as the Avro 546, featuring a fully enclosed cabin for the passengers.

Specifications (536)

References

External links
Avro 536 – British Aircraft Directory

1910s British civil utility aircraft
536
Single-engined tractor aircraft
Biplanes
Aircraft first flown in 1919
Rotary-engined aircraft